In mathematics, the root test is a criterion for the convergence (a convergence test) of an infinite series.  It depends on the quantity

where  are the terms of the series, and states that the series converges absolutely if this quantity is less than one, but diverges if it is greater than one.  It is particularly useful in connection with power series.

Root test explanation 

The root test was developed first by Augustin-Louis Cauchy who published it in his textbook Cours d'analyse (1821). Thus, it is sometimes known as the Cauchy root test or Cauchy's radical test. For a series

the root test uses the number

where "lim sup" denotes the limit superior, possibly ∞+. Note that if

converges then it equals C and may be used in the root test instead.

The root test states that:
 if C < 1 then the series converges absolutely,
 if C > 1 then the series diverges,
 if C = 1 and the limit approaches strictly from above then the series diverges,
 otherwise the test is inconclusive (the series may diverge, converge absolutely or converge conditionally).

There are some series for which C = 1 and the series converges, e.g. , and there are others for which C = 1 and the series diverges, e.g. .

Application to power series

This test can be used with a power series

where the coefficients cn, and the center p are complex numbers and the argument z is a complex variable.

The terms of this series would then be given by an = cn(z − p)n. One then applies the root test to the an as above. Note that sometimes a series like this is called a power series "around p", because the radius of convergence is the radius R of the largest interval or disc centred at p such that the series will converge for all points z strictly in the interior (convergence on the boundary of the interval or disc generally has to be checked separately). A corollary of the root test applied to such a power series is the Cauchy–Hadamard theorem: the radius of convergence is exactly  taking care that we really mean ∞ if the denominator is 0.

Proof 
The proof of the convergence of a series Σan is an application of the comparison test. If for all n ≥ N (N some fixed natural number) we have , then . Since the geometric series  converges so does  by the comparison test. Hence Σan converges absolutely. 

If  for infinitely many n, then an fails to converge to 0, hence the series is divergent.

Proof of corollary: 
For a power series Σan = Σcn(z − p)n, we see by the above that the series converges if there exists an N such that for all n ≥ N we have

equivalent to

for all n ≥ N, which implies that in order for the series to converge we must have  for all sufficiently large n. This is equivalent to saying

so  Now the only other place where convergence is possible is when

(since points > 1 will diverge) and this will not change the radius of convergence since these are just the points lying on the boundary of the interval or disc, so

Examples

Example 1: 

Applying the root test and using the fact that 
 
Since   the series diverges.

Example 2: 

The root test shows convergence because
 
This example shows how the root test is stronger than the ratio test. The ratio test is inconclusive for this series if  is odd so  (though not if  is even), because

Root tests hierarchy 

Root tests hierarchy is built similarly to the  ratio tests  hierarchy (see Section 4.1 of  ratio test, and more specifically Subsection 4.1.4 there).

For a series  with positive terms we have the following tests for convergence/divergence.

Let  be an integer, and let  denote the th iterate of natural logarithm, i.e.  and for any , 
.

Suppose that , when  is large, can be presented in the form

(The empty sum is assumed to be 0.)

	The series converges, if 
	The series diverges, if 
	Otherwise, the test is inconclusive.

Proof 

Since , then we have

From this,

From  Taylor's expansion applied to the right-hand side, we obtain:

Hence,

(The empty product is set to 1.)

The final result follows from the integral test for convergence.

See also
 Ratio test
 Convergent series

References 

  
 

Augustin-Louis Cauchy
Convergence tests
Articles containing proofs

pl:Kryteria zbieżności szeregów#Kryterium Cauchy'ego